Orthochromis polyacanthus is a species of cichlid native to the Democratic Republic of the Congo and Zambia, where it is known from the lower Congo River rapids near Pool Malebo (Stanley Pool) and the upper Congo River basin from the Kisangani area to the Lake Mweru basin.  This species can reach a length of  SL.

References

External links 

Fish of the Democratic Republic of the Congo
Fish of Zambia
polyacanthus
Fish described in 1899